PRIVATE was a pop music group formed in 2006 by Danish producer/singer Thomas Troelsen, along with guitarist Asger Tarpgaard and vocalist Tanja Simonsen, and was later a solo project by Troelsen. PRIVATE's debut album “My Secret Lover” was produced and recorded by Troelsen and mixed by Jason Boshoff (Basement Jaxx). The first single, of the same title, achieved Gold sales in Denmark and reached #1 on the Danish singles, radio, and download charts. "My Secret Lover" was released in the UK on 17 January 2010 on Virgin Records with remixes by Diplo, Egyptian Lover, Spencer & Hill, and Rune RK.

PRIVATE's debut received attention from a number of influential blogs including Perezhilton.com, Arjanwrites.com and the UK's Popjustice, who called the single "completely hypnotic and brilliant." The band has also been featured in Dazed & Confused, NME, Attitude, The Guardian, and Monocle. On his blog, Diplo —who remixed "My Secret Lover"—called PRIVATE "the best current pop music group in the world."

The Spencer & Hill remix of the track was featured on Friday Floor Fillers with Scott Mills on BBC's Radio 1. The track was also Record of the Week on Scott Mills' show on 7 December 2009 and Nick Grimshaw's show in September 2009.

In February 2010, Diplo's remix of "My Secret Lover" was featured in Prada's Spring/Summer 2010 Womenswear commercial.

On 3 September 2012 PRIVATE released “Everywhere,” a single featuring O.T. Genasis on Universal Music Denmark. The release featured remixes by MSTRKRFT, Sun Airway, Its Overture, DJ Woody, Flemming Dalum, Shoe Scene Symphony, Aylen, and Kannamix. Perez Hilton premiered the release and it was further profiled by Popjustice, Arjan Writes, and Interview Magazine.

On 12 April 2013 PRIVATE released "Hell Ain't a Bad Place To Be," a second single on Universal Music Denmark. The release was also profiled by Popjustice and Arjan writes, among others.

Discography

Albums

Singles

References

External links
 Official Web Site
 Private on Obscure Sound
 Private on Allmusic
 Private on Discogs

Musical groups established in 2006
Musical groups disestablished in 2013
Danish dance music groups
Danish pop music groups